Pierre Robert Olivetan/Olivétan (c. 1506 – 1538), a Waldensian by faith, was the first to translate the Bible into the French language starting from the Hebrew and Greek texts.

His work was based on that of his teacher Jacques Lefèvre d'Etaples. It was published in 1535 as La Bible Qui est toute la Saincte scripture at Neuchâtel. This translation has been considered the first French Protestant Bible.

Notes

External links 

 Selected books of Olivétan translation (with modern spelling)

People from Noyon
1538 deaths
French biblical scholars
Translators of the Bible into French
Year of birth uncertain
16th-century Calvinist and Reformed Christians